Strada statale 44 bis Passo del Rombo (SS 44 bis) is a motorway that connects Passeier Valley with Austria.

It originates in St. Leonhard in Passeier from Strada statale 44 del Passo di Giovo and ends at the national border, then continuing on the Austrian side with the Ötztalstraße. The road, detached from the SS 44 del Passo di Giovo, continues to climb the Passeier Valley passing through Moos in Passeier and reaches the Austrian border after just under 30 kilometers at the 2474 m of Timmelsjoch, while the other state road deviates to go up a lateral valley towards Jaufen Pass.

References 

44 bis
Transport in South Tyrol